KMGU (Russian: Контейнер малогабаритных грузов унифицированный, Unified Container for Small-sized Load) is a Soviet munitions dispenser similar to the British JP233 and the German MW-1. It can be carried by most Soviet and Russian attack aircraft, including the MiG-23, the MiG-27, the MiG-29, the Su-22, the Su-24, the Su-25, the Su-27, the Su-30, and the Su-34 and the Mi-24, Ka-50 and the Ka-52 attack helicopter. The cylindrical aluminum fuselage is divided into 8 sections, each has its own pneumatically opened doors. It can be filled with:
 96 (8×12) AO-2,5RT 2.5 kilogram-mass high explosive mines
 96 (8×12) PTM-1 anti-tank mines
 156 PFM-1S mines

KMGU-2 is an advanced version of the system. The Convention on Certain Conventional Weapons restricts the use of such weapon systems.

Users

See also 
 JP233
 MW-1
 K/YBS500
 TL500

External sources 
 КМГУ at the Sky Corner site
 KMG-U – janes.com

Aerial bombs of Russia
Cold War aerial bombs of the Soviet Union